Abdullah Al-Ahmar (born 6 June 1936) is a Syrian politician and prominent member of the Arab Socialist Ba'ath Party.

Biography
Born at Al-Tall, Ahmar joined the Ba'ath Party in the 1950s and graduated from the Faculty of Law at the University of Damascus in 1964.  Soon after, he was appointed as a governor of Hama (1967–1969) then Idlib (1969–1970). In 1970, the regional Ba'ath conference elected him to the Syrian Regional Command together with Hafez Al-Assad after an internal coup in the party that expelled Salah Jadid's faction from power. A few months later, Assad's faction held a meeting and appointed a new National Command that elected Assad as a general secretary and Ahmar his deputy. This National Command is competing with another one that was based in Iraq on being the sole legitimate National Command.

In 1980, Ahmar was re-elected with Assad into the same positions they held since 1971. Since the death of Assad in 2000, Ahmar is the highest ranked Ba'ath member in Syria, while Bashar Al-Assad is the general-secretary of the Syrian Regional Command.

On 25 July 2013, Abdullah al-Ahmar was the head of a Ba'ath Party delegation visiting North Korea.

References

Sources
Abdullah Al-Ahmar(in Arabic).
 (in Arabic)
Second Baath party figure arrested in Syria. Retrieved 2012-11-29

1936 births
Damascus University alumni
Living people
Members of the National Command of the Ba'ath Party (Syrian-dominated faction)
Members of the Regional Command of the Arab Socialist Ba'ath Party – Syria Region
People from Rif Dimashq Governorate
Syrian Muslims